Let Me Hear You Whisper may refer to:

second line in chorus of 1910 American song "Let Me Call You Sweetheart"
"Let Me Hear You Whisper" (song), internationally popular 1954 Samoan composition
Let Me Hear You Whisper (NET Playhouse), 1969 American TV play by Paul Zindel